Eana is a genus of tortrix moths (family Tortricidae). It belongs to the tribe Cnephasiini of subfamily Tortricinae.

Synonyms
Obsolete scientific names for this genus are:
 Ablabia Hübner, 1825
 Argyroptera Duponchel, 1834 (but see below)
 Eutrachia Hübner, 1822
 Nephodesma Stephens, 1834 (unjustified emendation)
 Nephodesme Hübner, 1825
 Subeana Obraztsov, 1963

The type species of Argyroptera (A. gouana) is not very well identifiable from its 1767 description (as Tortrix gouana) by Linnaeus. It was suspected to be a species of Aethes, but more probably is E. argentana. Hypostephanuncia is sometimes listed in the synonymy of Eana, but it is actually a junior synonym of Cnephasia (from which it was originally split).

Species
The 36 currently recognized species of Eana are:

 Eana agricolana (Kennel, 1919)
 Eana andreana (Kennel, 1919)
 Eana antiphila (Meyrick, 1913)
 Eana argentana (Clerck, 1759) (syn: Eana hungariae Razowski, 1958)
 Eana biruptana (Oberthür, 1922)
 Eana canescana (Guenee, 1845)
 Eana caradjai (Razowski, 1965)
 Eana clercana (de Joannis, 1908)
 Eana cottiana (Chrétien, 1898)
 Eana cyanescana (Réal, 1953)
 Eana derivana (Laharpe, 1858)
 Eana dominicana (Kennel, 1919)
 Eana filipjevi (Réal, 1953)
 Eana freii (Weber, 1945)
 Eana georgiella (Hulst, 1887)
 Eana herzegovinae (Razowski, 1959)
 Eana idahoensis (Obraztsov, 1963)
 Eana incanana (Stephens, 1852)

 Eana incognitana (Razowski, 1959)
 Eana incompta (Razowski, 1971)
 Eana italica (Obraztsov, 1950)
 Eana jaeckhi (Razowski, 1959)
 Eana joannisi (Schawerda, 1929)
 Eana maroccana (Filipjev, 1935)
 Eana nervana (de Joannis, 1908)
 Eana nevadensis (Rebel, 1928)
 Eana osseana (Scopoli, 1763)
 Eana pallifrons (Razowski, 1958)
 Eana penziana (Thunberg & Becklin, 1791)
 Eana rundiapicana (Razowski, 1959)
 Eana samarcandae (Razowski, 1958)
 Eana schonmanni (Razowski, 1959)
 Eana similis (Razowski, 1965)
 Eana tibetana (Caradja, 1939)
 Eana vetulana (Christoph, 1881)
 Eana viardi (Réal, 1953)

Footnotes

References

  (2009a): Online World Catalogue of the Tortricidae – Genus Eana account. Version 1.3.1. Retrieved 2009-JAN-20.
  (2009b): Online World Catalogue of the Tortricidae – Eana species list. Version 1.3.1. Retrieved 2009-JAN-20.
  (2005): Markku Savela's Lepidoptera and some other life forms – Eana. Version of 2005-SEP-14. Retrieved 2010-APR-14.

Cnephasiini
Tortricidae genera